Sidonie Josepha Grünwald-Zerkowitz (17 February 1852 – 12 June 1907) was an Austro-Hungarian writer, poet, translator, educator, and fashion designer.

Biography
Sidonie Zerkowitz was born into a Jewish family in Tobitschau, Moravia (now in the Czech Republic), the daughter of Jeanette and Gerson Zerkowitz. An ancestor on her father's side was a banker to Emperor Rudolf II in Prague. She received her early education from her father, a physician, becoming well-versed in German, French, Italian, Hungarian, Czech, and English. With her parents she moved to Holleschau, where she studied at a normal school. She later briefly attended boarding school in Vienna. Zerkowitz thereupon came to Budapest, and before long passed the final state examination to teach Hungarian history and language.

Zerkowitz wrote lyrical poems, essays and pedagogical articles in Hungarian for the daily and belletristic papers in Budapest, becoming well known in literary circles. Her pedagogical articles, which attracted the attention of Minister of Education Ágoston Trefort, advocated for reforms of the higher state institutions for girls in Hungary.

In November 1874, after teaching at a municipal school for a few years, she received from Ludwig II of Bavaria a free scholarship at his theatrical school in Munich. Her studies were interrupted the following month by her marriage to Prince Theodore Kolokotronis of Greece, grandson of Theodoros Kolokotronis and great-grandson of Prince John Caradja. (She had previously turned down a marriage proposal from the poet Kálmán Tóth.) Joining the Greek Byzantine Catholic Church, she accompanied her husband to Athens, where both she and her husband were disowned by the latter's family. The marriage was an unhappy one, and she soon fled Greece to her parents in Holleschau.

In order to earn a living, she gave up her plan to become an actress, left her newborn child in the care of her parents and took a job as a teacher in the village of Winau. In 1877, after securing a divorce, she re-converted to Judaism and married the wealthy Vienna merchant and widower Leopold Grünwald, with whom she bore five more children.

In Vienna, she became a fashion designer and edited the French and German fashion magazine La Mode. She lectured extensively on women's fashion in Vienna and Constantinople, and, after her husband's death in 1890, she took over the management of a Viennese language school.

Work
When only thirteen years of age she published her first essays on literature, in German and Hungarian, in the newspapers of Budapest.

In 1887 she anonymously published Die Lieder der Mormonin ('Songs of a Mormoness'), a verse novel printed in the format of a 4-metre-long Torah scroll. The work follows the sexual awakening of the protagonist as she enters a Mormon plural marriage. Though the book was banned in Austria as pornographic, by 1900, at least seven editions had appeared in print. Das Gretchen von Heute, a volume of erotic poetry, was subject to an obscenity trial soon after its release, and subsequently banned across the Austrian Empire.

In other publications, she took a stand against anti-Semitism, and promoted women's education and independence. Her Wie verheiratet man mitgiftlose Mädchen? (1905), for instance, argued for the creation of 'dowry funds' akin to pension and sick funds.

Other works by Grünwald-Zerkowitz included Zwanzig Gedichte von Koloman Tóth (Vienna, 1874), translated from Hungarian; Die Mode in der Frauenkleidung (Vienna, 1889); Das Gretchen von Heute (Zurich, 1890); Achmed's Ehe (1900); Doppel-Ehen (1900); Poetischer Hirt (1901); and Schattenseiten des Frauenstudiums (1901). She contributed many articles to newspapers; among those contributed to the Berlin Bühne und Welt included "Toilettenkünstlerinnen auf der Bühne", and critical essays on Sarah Bernhardt, Wolter, Dusé, Réjane, and Jane Hading, among others.

Partial bibliography
 
 
 
 
 
 
 
  Set to music by Otto Wick.

References

External links

 

1852 births
1907 deaths
19th-century Austrian Jews
19th-century Austrian poets
19th-century Austrian women writers
19th-century Czech poets
19th-century Czech women writers
19th-century Hungarian educators
19th-century Hungarian poets
19th-century Hungarian women writers
19th-century women educators
Austro-Hungarian designers
Austro-Hungarian educators
Austro-Hungarian emigrants to Greece
Austro-Hungarian Jews
Austro-Hungarian poets
Austro-Hungarian writers
Education writers
Fashion editors
German-language poets
German-language writers
Hungarian women poets
Hungarian-language writers
Jewish educators
Jewish fashion designers
Jewish women writers
Moravian Jews
Mormonism and polygamy
People from the Margraviate of Moravia
People from Tovačov
Pseudonymous women writers
Translators from Hungarian
Austrian women literary critics
Hungarian women literary critics
Austrian women essayists
Hungarian women essayists
Czech women essayists
Austrian women fashion designers
Czech women fashion designers
Hungarian women fashion designers
19th-century pseudonymous writers